Veselin Metodiev Petrov (born 3 November 1957, in Silistra) is a Bulgarian politician, member of Parliament & deputy chairman of Democrats for a Strong Bulgaria. He was Deputy Prime Minister and Minister of Education from 1997 until 1999 under Prime Minister Ivan Kostov.

Veselin Metodiev graduated in history from Sofia University in 1979 and after graduation worked in the Bulgarian General department of archives until 1993, in which he rose to head in 1992. He taught history in New Bulgarian University, of which he was also vice-rector in 1994. He was vice-chairman of the Democratic Party (Bulgaria) from 1995 till 2001 and Member of Parliament in the 37th and 38th National Assemblies. He was Deputy Prime Minister and Minister of Education from May 21, 1997 until December 21, 1999 in the government of the Union of Democratic Forces (UDF).

In 2004, he was part of a group of parliament members led by Ivan Kostov, to leave the UDF and establish a new political force, Democrats for a Strong Bulgaria (DSB), of which Veselin Metodiev was elected Vice Chairman. He is a Member of Parliament in the 40th National Assembly since 2005, and as such also a chairman of the parliamentary State Administration Affairs Committee and member of the Budget and Finance Committee.

In 2006, he was proposed by DSB as a joined right-wing presidential candidate for the 2006 presidential elections, but lost to Nedelcho Beronov due to lack of support of the remaining right-wing political parties.

In the 2009 Bulgarian parliamentary election, Veselin Metodiev was elected for Member of the 41st National Assembly from the 24-SOFIA 2 constituency, as a candidate of the Blue Coalition. In the National Assembly he is a member of the Legal Affairs Committee and the Education, Science, Children, Youths and Sports Committee.

Sources 
 https://web.archive.org/web/20061211112121/http://dsb.bg/display.php?page=19 (Dead Link)
 http://old.omda.bg/bulg/news/personal/metodiev.htm
 http://www.parliament.bg/?page=ns&lng=en&nsid=3&action=show&did=1011

1957 births
Living people
People from Silistra
Democratic Party (Bulgaria) politicians
Democrats for a Strong Bulgaria politicians
Deputy prime ministers of Bulgaria
Government ministers of Bulgaria
Silistra